Llanfyrnach railway station served the village of Llanfyrnach, Pembrokeshire, Wales, from 1875 to 1963 on the Whitland and Cardigan Railway.

History 
The station was opened on 12 July 1875 by the Whitland and Taf Vale Railway. It was situated north of a junction between two minor roads. The first station only had a wooden building. A new station was built in 1886. This had a stone building which was the stationmaster's house as well as a booking office and a waiting room. Two goods sheds were behind the platform and at the south end of the station was the signal box. This was later replaced by a ground frame in a wood cabin. At the north end was the goods yard which had two sidings and was controlled by the signal box. The north siding served a cattle dock. The nearby Llanfyrnach supplied some goods traffic to the station until it closed. The station closed to passengers on 10 September 1962 but remained open to goods traffic (besides parcels) until 27 May 1963.

References 

Disused railway stations in Pembrokeshire
Railway stations in Great Britain opened in 1875
Railway stations in Great Britain closed in 1963
1875 establishments in Wales
1963 disestablishments in Wales